Philenora is a genus of moths in the subfamily Arctiinae. The genus was erected by Rudolph Rosenstock in 1885.

Species
 Philenora aroa Bethune-Baker, 1904
 Philenora aspectalella Walker, 1864
 Philenora brunneata Daniel, 1965
 Philenora cataplex Turner, 1940
 Philenora chionastis Meyrick, 1886
 Philenora elegans Butler, 1877
 Philenora irregularis (Lucas, 1890)
 Philenora latifasciata Inoue & Kobayashi, 1963
 Philenora lunata (Lucas, 1890)
 Philenora malthaca Turner, 1944
 Philenora nudaridia Hampson, 1900
 Philenora omophanes Meyrick, 1886
 Philenora placochrysa Turner, 1899
 Philenora pteridopola Turner, 1922
 Philenora tenuilinea Hampson, 1914
 Philenora undulosa Walker, 1857

Taxonomy
Ochrota is treated as a synonym of Philenora by some sources.

References

Lithosiini
Moth genera